A ciliopathy is any genetic disorder that affects the cellular cilia or the cilia anchoring structures, the basal bodies, or ciliary function. Primary cilia are important in guiding the process of development, so abnormal ciliary function while an embryo is developing can lead to a set of malformations that can occur regardless of the particular genetic problem. The similarity of the clinical features of these developmental disorders means that they form a recognizable cluster of syndromes, loosely attributed to abnormal ciliary function and hence called ciliopathies. Regardless of the actual genetic cause, it is clustering of a set of characteristic physiological features which define whether a syndrome is a ciliopathy.

Although ciliopathies are usually considered to involve proteins that localize to motile and/or immotile (primary) cilia or centrosomes, it is possible for ciliopathies to be associated with unexpected proteins such as XPNPEP3, which localizes to mitochondria but is believed to affect ciliary function through proteolytic cleavage of ciliary proteins.

Significant advances in understanding the importance of cilia were made in the mid-1990s. However, the physiological role that this organelle plays in most tissues remains elusive. Additional studies of how ciliary dysfunction can lead to such severe disease and developmental pathologies is still a subject of current research.

Signs and symptoms
A wide variety of symptoms are potential clinical features of ciliopathy. The signs most exclusive to a ciliopathy, in descending order of exclusivity, are:
 Dandy–Walker malformation (cerebellar vermis hypoplasia, usually with hydrocephalus)
 Agenesis of the corpus callosum
 Situs inversus
 Posterior encephalocele
 Polycystic kidneys
 Postaxial polydactyly
 Liver disease
 Retinitis pigmentosa
 Intellectual disability

A case with polycystic ovary syndrome, multiple subcutaneous cysts, renal function impairment, Caroli disease and liver cirrhosis due to ciliopathy has been described.

Phenotypes sometimes associated with ciliopathies can include:
 Anencephaly
 Breathing abnormalities
 Cerebellar vermis hypoplasia
 Diabetes
 Exencephaly
 Eye movement abnormalities
 Hydrocephalus
 Hypoplasia of the corpus callosum
 Hypotonia
 Infertility
 Cognitive impairment/defects
 Obesity
 Other polydactyly
 Respiratory dysfunction
 Renal cystic disease
 Retinal degeneration
 Sensorineural deafness
 Spina bifida

Pathophysiology
"In effect, the motile cilium is a nanomachine composed of perhaps over 600 proteins in molecular complexes, many of which also function independently as nanomachines." Cilia "function as mechano- or chemosensors and as a cellular global positioning system to detect changes in the surrounding environment." For example, ciliary signaling plays a role in the initiation of cellular replacement after cell damage.

In addition to this sensory role mediating specific signaling cues, cilia play "a secretory role in which a soluble protein is released to have an effect downstream of the fluid flow" in epithelial cells, and can of course mediate fluid flow directly in the case of motile cilia. Primary cilia in the retina play a role in transferring nourishment to the non-vascularized rod and cone cells from the pigment epithelial vascularized cells several micrometres behind the surface of the retina.

Signal transduction pathways involved include the Hedgehog signaling pathway and the Wnt signaling pathway.

Dysfunctional cilia can lead to:
 Chemosensation abnormalities, typically via ciliated epithelial cellular dysfunction.
 Defective thermosensation or mechanosensation, often via ciliated epithelial cellular dysfunction.
 Cellular motility dysfunction
 Issues with displacement of extracellular fluid
 Paracrine signal transduction abnormalities

In organisms of normal health, cilia are critical for:
 development
 homeostasis
 reproduction

Genetics
"Just as different genes can contribute to similar diseases, so the same genes and families of genes can play a part in a range of different diseases." For example, in just two of the diseases caused by malfunctioning cilia, Meckel–Gruber syndrome and Bardet–Biedl syndrome, patients who carry mutations in genes associated with both diseases "have unique symptoms that are not seen in either condition alone." The genes linked to the two different conditions "interact with each other during development." Systems biologists are endeavoring to define functional modules containing multiple genes and then look at disorders whose phenotypes fit into such modules.

A particular phenotype can overlap "considerably with several conditions (ciliopathies) in which primary cilia are also implicated in pathogenicity. One emerging aspect is the wide spectrum of ciliopathy gene mutations found within different diseases."

List of ciliopathies
"The phenotypic parameters that define a ciliopathy may be used to both recognize the cellular basis of a number of genetic disorders and to facilitate the diagnosis and treatment of some diseases of unknown" cause.

Known ciliopathies

Likely ciliopathies

Possible ciliopathies

History
Although non-motile or primary cilia were first described in 1898, they were largely ignored by biologists. However, microscopists continued to document their presence in the cells of most vertebrate organisms. The primary cilium was long considered—with few exceptions—to be a largely useless evolutionary vestige, a vestigial organelle. Recent research has revealed that cilia are essential to many of the body's organs. These primary cilia play important roles in chemosensation, mechanosensation, and thermosensation. Cilia may thus be "viewed as sensory cellular antennae that coordinate a large number of cellular signaling pathways, sometimes coupling the signaling to ciliary motility or alternatively to cell division and differentiation."

Recent advances in mammalian genetic research have made possible the understanding of a molecular basis for a number of dysfunctional mechanisms in both motile and primary cilia structures of the cell. A number of critical developmental signaling pathways essential to cellular development have been discovered. These are principally but not exclusively found in the non-motile or primary cilia. A number of common observable characteristics of mammalian genetic disorders and diseases are caused by ciliary dysgenesis and dysfunction. Once identified, these characteristics thus describe a set of hallmarks of a ciliopathy.

Cilia have recently been implicated in a wide variety of human genetic diseases by "the discovery that numerous proteins involved in mammalian disease localize to the basal bodies and cilia." For example, in just a single area of human disease physiology, cystic renal disease, cilia-related genes and proteins have been identified to have causal effect in polycystic kidney disease, nephronophthisis, Senior–Løken syndrome type 5, orofaciodigital syndrome type 1 and Bardet–Biedl syndrome.

References

External links 

 The Ciliary Proteome Web Page at Johns Hopkins

 
Genetic diseases and disorders